Siculian (or Sicel) is an extinct Indo-European language spoken in central and eastern Sicily by the Sicels. It is attested in less than thirty inscriptions from the late 6th century to 4th century BCE, and in around twenty-five glosses from ancient writers.

Classification 
Ancient sources state that Siculians entered Sicily from the Italian Peninsula either around the 13th century or the middle of the 11th century BCE (or in two waves), driving the prior inhabitants, the Sicanians and Elymians, to the west of the island.

The prevalent modern view is that Siculian was an Italic language, although the scarcity of sources and the difficulties in interpreting inscriptions and glosses make it impossible to come to a definitive conclusion.

Attestations 
They used the Greek alphabet, along with a native one based upon Western Greek scripts, probably the Euboic-Chalkidic version. According to scholar Markus Hartmann, "of the fewer than thirty inscriptions in total, only six appear to be at least in part intelligible and to be  Siculian (i.e., most certainly neither Greek nor belonging to some other Italic or pre-Italic language)."

References

Bibliography

Further reading

 
 
  
 
 
 

Unclassified Indo-European languages
Languages of ancient Italy
Languages attested from the 6th century BC
Languages extinct in the 4th century BC